Joseph Brebsom (1913 – 12 April 2005) was a Luxembourgish politician.

A member of the Luxembourg Socialist Workers' Party (LSAP), Brebsom spent most of his career in the communal council of Esch-sur-Alzette.  He rose to hold position as an échevin (1965–1969, 1970–1978) and Mayor (1978–1990), replacing the Communist Arthur Useldinger.  He also sat in the Chamber of Deputies from 1974.

Mayors of Esch-sur-Alzette
Members of the Chamber of Deputies (Luxembourg)
Councillors in Esch-sur-Alzette
Luxembourg Socialist Workers' Party politicians
1913 births
2005 deaths